Malvern is a surname. Notable people with the surname include:

Corinne Malvern (1904–1956), American commercial artist
Gladys Malvern (1897–1962), American vaudeville and Broadway actress, radio script writer, and author
John Malvern (died 1442), Canon of Windsor
Scott Malvern (born 1989), British racing driver